The Thai television mystery music game show I Can See Your Voice Thailand premiered the fifth season on Workpoint TV on 13 October 2021.

Gameplay

Format
Under the original format, the guest artist can eliminate one or two mystery singers after each round. The game concludes with the last mystery singer standing which depends on the outcome of a duet performance with a guest artist.

Rounds
Each episode presents the guest artist with seven people whose identities and singing voices are kept concealed until they are eliminated to perform on the "stage of truth" or remain in the end to perform the final duet.

Episodes (2021)

Guest artists

Panelists

Episodes (2022)

Guest artists

Panelists

Notes

References 

I Can See Your Voice Thailand
2021 Thai television seasons
2022 Thai television seasons